The Vigilant Firehouse is a historic building in the Georgetown section of Washington, D.C. located at 1066 Wisconsin Ave., NW, just north of the Chesapeake and Ohio Canal and the Canal Monument.
The Vigilant Fire Company was organized in 1817 and this firehouse was built in 1844, making it the oldest extant firehouse in the District of Columbia. It was listed on the National Register of Historic Places in 1971.

Engine Company 5 was organized as a paid company on April 1, 1867 in this building as "Henry Addison Engine 5." In November 1883 Engine Company 5 moved around the corner to 3210 M Street, NW and the old firehouse was used for manufacturing. There are several stone markers on the site including one placed in 1869 to "Bush the 
Old Fire Dog."

The Vigilants
The Vigilants were an early private fire company, formed in 1817 with John Kurz as president, James Moore as Secretary and James Corcoran as Treasurer. It was among the oldest fire companies in the District of Columbia, and the oldest in Georgetown. Its first fire engine, called the Vigilant, was bought from John Agnue of Philadelphia. After an 1848 reorganization, the company gradually came under the control of the government, forming Georgetown's Fire company No. 1 in 1867 and the District of Columbia's Fire Company No. 5 in 1871. In 1868 the company bought what is believed to be the first steam fire engine in the District of Columbia.

The Vigilant fireman developed a reputation for rowdyism.

Even saying the name of the company could draw a fine at early meetings of the Georgetown Fire Department, according to Albert Cassedy.  "The proceedings of the meeting were so interesting that two members were fined ten cents each for swearing, and a resolution was passed that any member who mentioned the name of the Vigilant Fire Company should be fined 25 cents."

A stone tablet sits at ground level between the two main doorways and reads "Bush, the Old Fire Dog, Died of Poison, July 5th 1869, R.I.P." The story was related by Cassedy:

Architecture
A frame building was built on the site sometime before 1829.  In 1843 this building was moved across the street to 1069 Wisconsin, where it stood until it was demolished in 1964.
The current building was built in 1844 as a two-story  by  rectangle with a single room on each floor, a square wooden cupola and a gable facing the street. An early addition was a two-story shed in the rear, likely used as a stable on the first floor and for hay storage on the second. A single story shed was added to the south, and a two-story addition to the north, both of which run the full depth of the building.

On the front gable a stone is inscribed "Vigilant, Instituted, 1817" and below this is a wrought iron "V", likely a trademark for the Vigilants.
The "V" also serves as a tension rod tie and is matched by an "S" on the back of the building.

After 1883 the building was used for manufacturing, including the Palmer Bottling Works and then McKittrick, Inc., a mattress factory, until about 1970.  A 2008 photograph shows the building in use as a restaurant.

References

Sources
 Historic American Buildings Survey, Vigilant Firehouse, 1964 (HABS), National Park Service, retrieved 2012-01-01. 
 , Vigilant Firehouse, 1970, Nancy C. Taylor, National Capital Planning Commission, retrieved 2012-01-01.

External links

 c. 1950 photo (at the bottom of the page)
 

Defunct fire stations in Washington, D.C.
Fire stations completed in 1844
Fire stations on the National Register of Historic Places in Washington, D.C.
Georgetown (Washington, D.C.)